Trevor Ashley (born 27 February 1980) is an Australian musical theatre actor, cabaret and drag artist based in Sydney. He also has appeared on television in "The Very Trevor Ashley Show"

Early life
Ashley grew up in the south of Sydney and studied at the Shopfront a contemporary theatre. There he worked with Errol Bray, John Du Feu and playwright Hilary Bell. He appeared in Alice with Paul Capsis, and in Peter Pan with screen actor Bryan Brown. He also played Passepartout in their production of Around the World in Eighty Days.

Ashley attended Sydney Technical High School where he studied music and drama, played in the school bands and began writing orchestrations and arrangements. He was then chosen to be part of the Schools Spectacular, and the Talent Development Project under the direction of Mary Lopez. He graduated from high school in 1997.

Career

Cabaret
Ashley made his professional debut in the Sydney Cabaret Convention 1998. His performance impressed both the critics and judges with the Cabaret Hotline calling him "A knockout performer… the clear crowd favourite and the only one to emulate a 'cabaret sensibility'". He then toured his show Trevor The Arena Mega Musical to New York's Don't Tell Mama and The Talk of London in England.

On return to Australia, he created the show Pop Princess with Phil Scott. He soon became "Mardi Gras Royalty" and followed up this with Pop Princess 2, two years later in 2005.

Priscilla film director Stephan Elliott then chose Ashley to sing the theme song to his 2008 film Easy Virtue, "Let's Misbehave". The film stars Colin Firth, Jessica Biel and Kristin Scott Thomas. After this, Ashley created and continued to host Showqueen, a weekly cabaret night at the Supper Club in Sydney. Showqueen featured special guests and notable cabaret performers, and also had a successful season in Melbourne. Previous guests have included Toni Lamond, iOTA, Virginia Gay, Genevieve Lemon and Matthew Robinson.

For Mardi Gras 2009, Ashley teamed with drag star Courtney Act to great acclaim in Gentlemen Prefer Blokes, a bawdy revue style show that ran in Sydney twice, and also played the Adelaide Cabaret Festival and a season at His Majesty's Theatre, Perth. Gentlemen Prefer Blokes had to be rewritten two weeks prior to the Sydney run after Courtney Act suffered a broken leg while skiing in Canada. Soap star Virginia Gay from Channel 7's All Saints joined the cast to play Courtney's body double.

I'm Every Woman, commissioned by the Sydney Opera House, paid tribute to Ashley's favourite divas living and dead. The show was nominated for a Sydney Theatre Award for Best Cabaret.

He has nominated for a Helpmann Award for Best Cabaret Performer for Diamonds are for Trevor in 2012, in which Ashley appeared as Shirley Bassey.

Liza (on a E), featuring his impersonation of Liza Minnelli, had seasons in Australian and the UK. In 2015, he announced a new cabaret show, entitled Liza's Back! (is broken), debuting at the Fairfax Studio, Arts Centre Melbourne from 21–31 January 2016.

He played Natalie Portly in his adult pantomime Fat Swan in 2012, a Black Swan parody written with longtime collaborator Phil Scott. His 2013 musical comedy Little Orphan trAshley starred Rhonda Burchmore and Gary Sweet.

Theatre 
Ashley created the role of Miss Understanding in the original cast of Priscilla, Queen of the Desert: The Musical. He performed the role over 600 times in Sydney and Melbourne, and is featured on the original cast recording, singing "What's Love Got To Do With It?".

He performed in Jerry Springer: The Opera under the direction of Gale Edwards at the Sydney Opera House in 2009.

In 2010–2011, Ashley played the role of Edna Turnblad in Hairspray in Melbourne and Sydney.

In July 2012, Ashley appeared as Franz Leibkind in The Producers for The Production Company in Melbourne.

Ashley played Thenadier in the Australian 2014–2015 tour of Les Misérables, opposite Lara Mulcahy as Madame Thenadier. For this role, he was nominated for a Helpmann Award for Best Male Actor in a Supporting Role in a Musical and received a Best Supporting Performer in Music Theatre (male) Award at Sydney's 2015 Glug Awards.

In 2015, Ashley directed the Australian premiere of Heathers: The Musical. The production was first staged at Hayes Theatre in Sydney for a 19-day run, and then was transferred the following year for short seasons in Brisbane, Melbourne and Sydney (with the latter being an encore production staged at the Sydney Opera House).

2017 saw Ashley play King Herod in the Australian revival of Jesus Christ Superstar, starring alongside Rob Mills as Christ. The production ran from 29 July to 13 August at Arts Centre Melbourne.

Television
In 2012, Australian network SBS announced it had commissioned a pilot called The Very Trevor Ashley Show. It was shown as a one-night-only program in May 2012.

References

External links
 

1980 births
Living people
Australian drag queens
People educated at Sydney Technical High School
Australian LGBT singers
LGBT cabaret performers